Marcelo Melo and Bruno Soares were the defending champions but decided not to participate together.
Melo plays alongside Thomaz Bellucci, while Soares partners up with Eric Butorac. They met in the Quarterfinals, where Soares and Butorac advanced.
They went on to win the title against Michal Mertiňák and André Sá 3–6, 6–4, [10–8] in the final.

Seeds

Draw

Draw

References
 Main Draw

Brasil Open - Doubles
2012 Brasil Open